Jocelynn Birks (born August 21, 1993) is an American volleyball player who plays in the German Women's Volleyball League.

Playing career 
She played for the University of Illinois.
She participated at the 2016–17 Women's CEV Cup, with Dresdner SC.

Clubs

References

External links 

 http://www.cev.lu/Competition-Area/PlayerDetails.aspx?TeamID=9979&PlayerID=67108&ID=968
 http://www.cev.lu/Competition-Area/CompetitionNews.aspx?NewsID=23784&ID=968
 http://bringitusa.com/blog/player/birks-jocelynn/
 http://www.news-gazette.com/sports/illini-sports/volleyball/2016-07-09/2016-illinois-female-athlete-year-jocelynn-birks.html

1993 births
Living people
American women's volleyball players
Illinois Fighting Illini women's volleyball players
People from Willow Springs, Illinois
Sportspeople from Illinois